and its sequel, is a Japanese anime television series, created by Gonzo, and is an animated reboot/continuation of Namco's Babylonian Castle Saga video game franchise which began as an arcade game, The Tower of Druaga, originally released in 1984. This series is amongst the first to be officially broadcast on the internet by Gonzo simultaneously in Japanese and subtitled in English on YouTube, and BOST TV.

Plot

It has been eighty years since King Gilgamesh defeated "the tower" single-handedly (as depicted in the original game, The Tower of Druaga), and now the tower is reborn again. The "Summer of Anu" is a season that comes every few years during which the powers of the monsters within the Tower wane thanks to the grace of the great god Anu. Each Summer of Anu, the armies of the Uruk Kingdom secure their strongholds within the Tower, aiming to eventually conquer the upper floors. The story begins with the third Summer of Anu. The city of Meskia is the first stronghold built on the first level of the Tower. In addition to the Uruk Army preparing for their third campaign against Druaga, innumerable adventurers called "climbers" have been drawn to Meskia by rumors of the Blue Crystal Rod, a legendary treasure believed to be hidden on the top floor of the Tower. Jil, a young guardian, has traveled to the tower and Meskia, the last safe stop on the first floor of the tower. The story follows Jil, a new climber who wishes to reach the top floor of the tower. On the top floor is the evil lord Druaga, and numerous monsters and traps inhabit the floors along the way.

The second season, titled The Tower of Druaga: The Sword of Uruk, picks up "half a year after" the events of the first season. With Druaga's guardian defeated, the monsters of the tower have disappeared and a period of peace and prosperity have descended upon the people. Jil and Fatina, having survived the tower's collapse, attempt to move on with their lives while still coming to terms with Neeba and Kaaya's betrayal. This all changes when they rescue a mysterious girl from a group of soldiers. They learn that this young girl, Ki, may be the key to unlocking a great secret within the tower. Armed with this knowledge and haunted by a troubling vision of the future, Jil once again prepares to climb the tower.

Anime

The Tower of Druaga was broadcast on Animax from April 1, 2008 to March 26, 2009. It was later broadcast by other Japanese television networks such as tvk, KBS, Sun TV, Chiba TV, Tokyo MX, GBS, TV Saitama, GyaO, TVQ. The anime was produced by Gonzo. It was directed by Koichi Chigira. The chief screenwriter for the series was Shoji Gatoh. Hitoshi Sakimoto was the composer for the music heard in the anime, with Eminence Symphony Orchestra playing the pieces created by Sakimoto specifically for The Aegis of Uruk. In 2009, Funimation acquired a license for the series.

See also
 List of anime based on video games
 Tower of Babel
 Tower of God

References

External links

Funimation's official Tower of Druaga anime website
 
 
 Tower of Druaga at Anime Streaming Search Engine

2008 Japanese television series debuts
2008 Japanese television series endings
2008 manga
Anime television series based on video games
Alternative sequel television series
Cultural depictions of Gilgamesh
Funimation
Gonzo (company)
Kadokawa Shoten manga
Manga based on video games
Seinen manga
Works based on Bandai Namco video games